Francisca Mardones (born 24 September 1977) is a Chilean wheelchair tennis player. She has competed at both the 2012 and 2016 Summer Paralympics in tennis, before retiring in 2017 to concentrate on athletics.

Career
Francisca Mardones was born on 24 September 1977. While she was a child, she wanted to compete in sports and represent Chile at an Olympic Games. She studied hotel management, eventually looking after some cabins on Culebra, Puerto Rico. The resort was hit by Hurricane Lenny in 1999; while checking to make sure her guests had made their way to a shelter, she was hit by a landslide and fell into a ravine. She could not move for several minutes, but managed to crawl free to a nearby shelter, where she was found two days later. The fall damaged her spine, leaving her needing to use a wheelchair. She had several operations, and spent the following four years in recovery. She has since learnt to walk short distances with a cane, but is in pain while doing so.

After the injury, she took up wheelchair tennis, both playing it for Chile and also teaching it to others. Mardones had begun playing at the Grey Rock Tennis Club in Austin, Texas, and was there when she learnt that she had been selected for the Chilean team. She is supported financially through sponsorships, although says that she has to dip a little into her savings to pay for travel to the World Championships on some occasions. She took part in the Parapan American Games, where she won bronze medals in 2007 in Rio de Janeiro and in 2011 in Guadalajara. Also representing Chile, she took part in the 2012 Summer Paralympics in London, England, and the 2016 Games in Rio de Janeiro. She has won several awards, including those for inspiring others and a Golden Condor for best Paralympic Tennis performance in 2014.

She sustained further injury in 2017, when she cut her right hand with a knife in the kitchen, causing nerve damage. She had been trying field athletics prior to this, as she had found that she would need to travel less often. Following the injury, she feared that it would slow her down in the wheelchair, but would not affect how she threw javelins, discus or shot put. So she decided to retire from tennis, and only pursue athletics instead.

References

External links

Living people
1977 births
Paralympic wheelchair tennis players of Chile
Wheelchair tennis players at the 2012 Summer Paralympics
Wheelchair tennis players at the 2016 Summer Paralympics
Paralympic athletes of Chile
Chilean female shot putters
Chilean female discus throwers
Chilean female javelin throwers
Medalists at the 2019 Parapan American Games
World Para Athletics Championships winners
Athletes (track and field) at the 2020 Summer Paralympics
People with paraplegia
21st-century Chilean women